The Journal of the Operations Research Society of China is a quarterly peer-reviewed academic journal covering operations research. It is published by Springer Science+Business Media on behalf of the Operations Research Society of China. The editor-in-chief is Ya-xiang Yuan (Chinese Academy of Sciences). The journal is abstracted and indexed in Scopus and Zentralblatt Math.

References

External links 

 
  at Springer Science+Business Media
 Print: 
 Online: 

Business and management journals
Quarterly journals
Springer Science+Business Media academic journals
Publications established in 2013
English-language journals